Joseph-Marie Trịnh Như Khuê (11 December 1898 – 27 November 1978) was the first Vietnamese cardinal of the Catholic Church. He served as Archbishop of Hanoi from 1960 until his death, having previously served as its apostolic vicar, and was elevated to the cardinalate in 1976.

Biography
Khuê was born in Tràng Duệ, Bình Lục, Hà Nam  and ordained to the priesthood on 1 April 1932. On 18 April 1950, he was appointed Apostolic Vicar of Hanoi and Titular Bishop of Synaus by Pope Pius XII. Khuê received his episcopal consecration on the following 15 August from Bishop Thaddeus Lê Hữu Từ, OCist, with Bishops Francisco Gomez de Santiago, OP, and Peter Phạm Ngọc Chi serving as co-consecrators, in the Cathedral of Hanoi. He was later raised to the rank of a Metropolitan Archbishop upon his vicariate's elevation to a metropolitan see on 24 November 1960.

The archbishop was reserved as a cardinal in pectore by Pope Paul VI when the consistory was announced on April 28, 1976, and was published and created Cardinal Priest of S. Francesco di Paola ai Monti at the consistory on 24 May of that same year. Khue attended the consistory in the purple robes of a bishop, because he did not have time to get red ones. He was the first cardinal to hail from Vietnam, and was also one of the cardinal electors who participated in the conclaves of August and October 1978, which selected Popes John Paul I and John Paul II respectively.

Cardinal Khuê died in Hanoi, at the age of 79; he had been the ecclesiastical leader of Hanoi for twenty-eight years. He is buried in St. Joseph's Cathedral, Hanoi.

References

External links
Cardinals of the Holy Roman Church
Catholic-Hierarchy

1898 births
1978 deaths
People from Hanoi
Vietnamese cardinals
20th-century Roman Catholic archbishops in Vietnam
Participants in the Second Vatican Council
Cardinals created by Pope Paul VI
Vietnamese Roman Catholic archbishops